Laleli may refer to:

 Laleli, Fatih
 Laleli, Pazaryolu
 Laleli, Refahiye
 Laleli, Pazaryolu, a village in the Pazaryolu district in Eastern Turkey